Saitual district is one of the eleven districts of Mizoram state in India. Saitual district became operational on 3

History
The Demand for Saitual District had started from 1974. The Citizen Committee was established in 1993. The Saitual District Implenting Demand Committee consisting of several civil society groups who staged demonstrations for Demanding a full-fledged district. Saitual District was finally created on 12 September 2008.

Toponymy
The district is named after its headquarters Saitual.Although Saitual is the maim headquarter of the district, its capital is Keifang. Keifang is the main attraction of the district. Markets,Entertainments, Schools, Offices, Sports and Medical Institutions are located in Keifang.

Transport 
The Distance between Saitual and Aizawl, the state capital is 77 km and is connected with regular service of Buses and Maxicabs.

Divisions 
The district has three Legislative Assembly constituencies. These are Chalfilh, Ṭawi and Lengteng. There are thirty seven inhabited towns and villages in this district with10,219 Families with 50,575 people residing in them. There are 25,607 Men and 24,968 women respectively. The District Capital has 2,457 families with a population of 11,619 residing in them.

References

Districts of Mizoram